Sergeant Edward Hoare  (18 July 1890 – 8 October 1973) was a British First World War flying ace credited with seven aerial victories as an observer/air gunner.

Early life
Hoare was born on 18 July 1890 in Acton Vale, London.

Military service
Hoare joined the Royal Naval Air Service and trained as an air gunner, first serving on the airship N.S.1, but was later posted to No. 88 Squadron RFC. On 1 April 1918 the RNAS became part of the newly formed Royal Air Force. Between June and August 1918 flying as a Bristol F.2b observer/air gunner he was credited, along with his pilots Lieutenants Alec Williamson and C. Foster, with seven victories. He was wounded on 17 August 1918 and shot down and wounded again in October 1918, staying in hospital to the end of the war.

In 1939 Hoare re-enlisted in the RAF, serving as aircrew for a year before being discharged because of his age. He spent the rest of the war serving in the ARP in Forest Gate, East London.

Honours and awards
Serjt. Edward Hoare was awarded the Distinguished Flying Medal on 1 January 1919.

See also
 List of World War I aces credited with 7 victories

References

1890 births
1973 deaths
People from Acton, London
British World War I flying aces
Royal Air Force airmen
Royal Air Force personnel of World War I
Royal Naval Air Service aviators
Recipients of the Distinguished Flying Medal
Military personnel from London